Steve Herberman (born September 10, 1966) is an American jazz guitarist and educator.

Career
Herberman is a graduate of Berklee College of Music. In 1993, he adopted the seven-string guitar. He has performed across the United States and Europe. In the US he has performed at venues such as Birdland and The Bar Next Door in New York City, Spazio in Los Angeles, the NAMM shows in Anaheim and Nashville. Closer to his home near Washington DC he has performed at Blues Alley, the Smithsonian Jazz Cafe, and the Kennedy Center for the Performing Arts. Herberman has played with Keter Betts, Buster Williams, Gary Bartz, Drew Gress, Chuck Berghofer, Jim Snidero, Chuck Redd, Ali Ryerson, Steve Williams, Steve LaSpina, Jeff Hirshfield, and John Pisano.

As educator
Herberman taught at Towson University in Baltimore for fourteen years as an adjunct faculty member. He has presented masterclasses in Italy, the U.K. and at universities across the U.S. He  has written instructional material for Down Beat magazine, Mel Bay's Guitar Sessions, Just Jazz Guitar, the National Guitar Workshop newsletter and columns for Modern Guitars and Fingerstyle Guitar Journal webzines. He is an online instructor and producer of jazz instructional videos.

Critical reception
Steve Herberman's original song "What We Do" won first place in the jazz category of the 2018 USA Songwriting Competition. 
Herberman's recordings have received praise from JazzTimes, Down Beat, and Jazz Improv. His album Action:Reaction was chosen as one of the top 50 CD's of 2007 by Jazz Improv magazine. He has been featured on the cover of Just Jazz Guitar magazine (Feb. 2009) and "Fingerstyle Guitar Journal" (October 2015.)

He has released four albums as a leader and two albums as a co-leader: Thoughtlines (2001) Action:Reaction (2006)Ideals (2008) Between Friends (2015) A  Little Closer (2018) and Counterbalance (2019.)Ideals reached the Top 10 on the JazzWeek chart for national airplay, staying on the chart for 16 weeks.

Selected Discography
 Thoughtlines (2001)
 Action:Reaction (2006)
 Ideals (2008)
 Between Friends (2015)
 A Little Closer (2018)
 Counterbalance (2019)

References

American jazz guitarists
Seven-string guitarists
1966 births
Living people
Berklee College of Music alumni
Towson University faculty
20th-century American guitarists